Xavier Malisse was the defending champion, but lost in the quarterfinals to Mikhail Youzhny.

Fourth-seeded Mikhail Youzhny won in the final 6–0, 6–1, against first-seeded Rafael Nadal.

Seeds

Draw

Finals

Top half

Bottom half

External links
 Main Draw
 Qualifying draw

Singles

fr:Open de Chennai 2008
nl:ATP-toernooi van Madras 2008